Argentines (mistakenly translated as "Argentinians" in the past); in Spanish  (masculine) or  (feminine) are people identified with the country of Argentina. This connection may be residential, legal, historical or cultural. For most Argentines, several (or all) of these connections exist and are collectively the source of their being Argentine.

Argentina is a multiethnic and multilingual society, home to people of various ethnic, religious, and national origins, with the majority of the population made up of Old World immigrants and their descendants. As a result, Argentines do not equate their nationality with ethnicity, but with citizenship and allegiance to Argentina. Aside from the indigenous population, nearly all Argentines or their ancestors immigrated within the past five centuries. Among countries in the world that have received the most immigrants in modern history, Argentina, with 6.6 million, ranks second to the United States (27 million), and ahead of other immigrant destinations such as Canada, Brazil and Australia.

Ethnic groups

Overview
Argentina is a multiethnic society, which means that it is home to people of many different ethnic backgrounds. Argentina is a melting pot of different peoples.

In the mid-19th century a large wave of immigration started to arrive in Argentina due to new Constitutional policies that encouraged immigration, and issues in the countries the immigrants came from, such as wars, poverty, hunger, and famines. The main immigration sources were from Europe, the countries from the Near and the Middle East, Russia, and Japan. Eventually, Argentina became the country with the second-largest number of immigrants in the period, with 6.6 million, second only to the United States with 27 million.

Therefore, most Argentines are of full or partial European descent (with a significant indigenous component, and a less prominent black component), and are either descendants of colonial-era settlers and/or of the 19th and 20th century immigrants from Europe.

The most common ethnic groups are a mix between Spanish (including Galicians and Basques), Italian and Native American. It is estimated that up to 30 million Argentines, up to 62.5% of the total population, have Italian ancestry, wholly or in part. There are also some Germanic, Slavic, Irish and French populations. Smaller Jewish, Arab, Asian, Romani and African communities contribute to the melting pot.

Immigration of recent decades includes mainly Paraguayans, Bolivians and Peruvians, among other Latin Americans, Eastern Europeans, Africans and Asians.

Genetics studies
Large comprehensive studies across Argentina's many regions in order to characterize the genetic admixture have been lacking. Small sample size studies give the following composition.
 Homburguer et al., 2015, PLOS One Genetics: 67% European, 28% Amerindian, 4% African and 1.4% Asian.
 Avena et al., 2012, PLOS One Genetics: 65% European, 31% Amerindian, and 4% African. 
 Buenos Aires Province: 76% European and 24% others.
 South Zone (Chubut Province): 54% European and 46% others.
 Northeast Zone (Misiones, Corrientes, Chaco & Formosa provinces): 54% European and 46% others.
 Northwest Zone (Salta Province): 33% European and 67% others.
 Oliveira, 2008, on Universidade de Brasília: 60% European, 31% Amerindian and 9% African.
 National Geographic: 52% European, 27% Amerindian ancestry, 9% African and 9% others.
Corach, Daniel (2010): 78.5% European, 17.3% Amerindian, and 4.2% Black African ancestry.
Parolin et al., (2019): PLOS One Genetics: 62.1% European, 35.8% Native American and 2.1% African.

A team led by Daniel Corach conducted a study in 2009, analyzing 246 samples from eight provinces and three different regions of the country. The results were as follows: the analysis of Y-Chromosome DNA revealed a 94.1% of European contribution, and only 4.9% and 0.9% of Native American and Black African contribution, respectively. Mitochondrial DNA analysis again showed a great Amerindian contribution by maternal lineage, at 53.7%, with 44.3% of European contribution, and a 2% African contribution. The study of 24 autosomal markers also proved a large European contribution of 78.5%, against 17.3% of Amerindian and 4.2% Black African contributions.

Several studies found out that the European ancestry in Argentina comes mainly from the Iberian Peninsula and Italy with a much lower contribution from Central and Northern Europe. The Italian component appears strongest in the East and Center-West, while the Spanish influence dominates in the North East and North West.

European Argentines

Argentines of total or partial European descent constitute the majority of Argentina's population. Ethnic Europeans include the Argentine descendants of colonists from Spain during the colonial period prior to 1810, and mainly of immigrants from Europe in the great immigratory wave from the mid 19th century to the mid 20th century. No recent Argentine census has included comprehensive questions on ethnicity, although numerous studies have determined that European Argentines have been a majority in the country since 1914. Some international sources claim the European component of the population to be at around 97%.

The most numerous immigrant European communities are: Spaniards (including Basques, Asturians and Galicians), Italians (62.5% of the population have some degree of Italian descent), Germans, Scandinavians (mainly Danes and Swedes), Slavs (including Russians, Ukrainians, Poles, Czechs, Bulgarians, Slovenes, Serbs and Croats), Finns, the French (including francophone Basques), the Irish, Portuguese, the Dutch, among others in smaller number.

There are approximately 300,000 Romani people in Argentina. They belong to the Romani subgroups Greek, Moldavian and Russian Kalderash, some Lovari and some Chilean Xoraxane. There are also Spanish Kalé and Boyash living in Argentina.

Mestizo Argentines
Within the population totals, there may be an imprecise amount of mixed population.
In one of the most comprehensive genetic studies involving the population of Argentina, 441 Argentines from across the North East, North West, Southern, and Central provinces (especially the urban conglomeration of Buenos Aires) of the country, it was observed that the sample population comprised on average of 65% European, followed by 31% Amerindian, and finally 4% of African ancestry; however, this study was unweighted and meant to be a representation of the diversity of Argentine DNA rather than a demonstration of the average ethnic composition of the country. It was also found there were great differences in the ancestry amongst Argentines as one traveled across the country. A study by Daniel Corach that attempted to find the average Argentine ancestry by weighing the population of various regions gave a significantly higher estimate of European ancestry at 78.5% of the average Argentine's autosomal DNA.

Indigenous Argentines

Argentina has 35 officially recognized indigenous people groups.

The most populous indigenous groups were the Aonikenk, Kolla, Qom, Wichí, Diaguita, Mocoví, Huarpe peoples, Mapuche and Guarani Many Argentines also identify as having at least one indigenous ancestor; a genetic study conducted by the University of Buenos Aires in 2011 showed that more than 56% of the 320 Argentines sampled were shown to have at least one indigenous ancestor in one parental lineage and around 11% had indigenous ancestors in both parental lineages.

Jujuy Province, in the Argentine Northwest, is home to the highest percentage of households (15%) with at least one indigenous resident or a direct descendant of an indigenous person; Chubut and Neuquén Provinces, in Patagonia, have upwards of 12%.

Afro-Argentines

According to the Argentine national census of 2010, 149,493 (0.37% of the country's overall population) identified as Afro-Argentine, although according to gene pools studies, the Argentine population with some degree of Sub-Saharan African descent would be around 7.5%. World Bank and Argentine government estimates have suggested the Argentine population with significant African ancestry could number over 2 million.

Despite the fact that in the 1960s it was calculated that Argentina owed two thirds of the volume of its population to European immigration, over 5% of Argentines state they have at least one black ancestor, and a further 20% state they do not know whether or not they have any black ancestors. Genetic studies carried out in 2005 showed that the average level of African genetic contribution in the population of Buenos Aires is 2.2%, but that this component is concentrated in 10% of the population who display notably higher levels of African ancestry. Today there is still a notable Afro-Argentine community in the Buenos Aires districts of San Telmo and La Boca. There are also quite a few African-descended Argentines in Merlo and Ciudad Evita, in the Buenos Aires metropolitan area.

Immigration from Cape Verde was one of the earliest African migratory flows in the post-colonial era, beginning as early as the late 19th century and well into the 20th century. Today, Cape Verdeans constitute one of the largest African immigrant communities, numbering over 15,000; they mainly live in port cities in Buenos Aires Province, such as Ensenada and Dock Sud. Immigration from Senegal, Nigeria, Sierra Leone, Angola and other African countries in recent decades has caused a surge in the country's black population as well.

Asian Argentines

Argentines of Asian ancestry are defined as either born within Argentina, or born elsewhere and later to become a citizen or resident of Argentina. Asian Argentines settled in Argentina in large numbers during several waves of immigration in the 19th and 20th centuries. In the 19th century, West Asian immigrants, primarily from Lebanon and Syria came as a result of the 1860 Mount Lebanon civil war. In the early 20th century, a small wave of East Asian immigrants, particularly from Japan came to the country.

East Asians
The first Argentines of East Asian descent were a small group of Japanese immigrants, mainly from the Okinawa prefecture, which came in the period between the early and mid 20th century. In the 1960s, Koreans began to arrive, and in the 1980s, Taiwanese immigrants. The 1990s brought the largest wave of Asian immigration so far to Argentina, from mainland Chinese immigrants, eventually becoming the fourth largest immigrant community in 2013, after Paraguayans, Bolivians, and Peruvians. The small East Asian Argentine population has generally kept a low profile, and is accepted by greater Argentine society. Primarily living in their own neighbourhoods in Buenos Aires, many currently own their own businesses of varying sizes – largely textiles, grocery stores, and buffet-style restaurants.

West Asian/Arab Argentines

Arabs and Argentines with partial Arab ancestry represent about 3.2 million people, whose ancestry traces back to any of various waves of immigrants, largely from the Levantine region of Western Asia, from what is now Syria and Lebanon; and from Cilicia and Palestine in a lesser extent. Due to the fact that many Arab countries were under control of the Ottoman Empire by the time the large immigration wave took place, most Arabs entered the country with Turkish passports, and so they are colloquially referred to as los turcos. The majority of Arab-Argentines are Christians,  albeit Argentina is the Latin American country with the largest Muslim population and the one that host the largest mosque. There is also a sizeable Syrian-Lebanese Jewish community in the country, mainly centred in Buenos Aires, Rosario and Tucumán.

Languages

Although Spanish is dominant, being the national language spoken by virtually all Argentines, at least 40 languages are spoken in Argentina. Languages spoken by at least 100,000 Argentines include Amerindian languages such as Southern Quechua, Guaraní and Mapudungun, and immigrant languages such as German, Italian, or Levantine Arabic.

Two native languages are extinct (Abipón and Chané), while some others are endangered, spoken by elderly people whose descendants do not speak the languages (such as Vilela, Puelche, Tehuelche and Selknam).

There are also other communities of immigrants that speak their native languages, such as the Chinese language spoken by at least half of the over 60,000 Chinese immigrants (mostly in Buenos Aires) and an Occitan-speaking community in Pigüé, Buenos Aires Province. Welsh is also spoken by over 35,000 people in the Chubut Province. This includes a dialect called Patagonian Welsh, which has developed since the start of the Welsh settlement in Argentina in 1865.

A high percentage of Argentines are proficient in the English language since its teaching is included in educational establishments as early as kindergarten.

While of course not everybody falls under a C2 category regarding proficiency in the English language, there's a large number of people who are at least able to hold a conversation and make themselves understood.

Religion

A majority of the population of Argentina is Christian. According to CONICET survey on creeds, about 76.5% of Argentines are Roman Catholic, 11.3% religiously indifferent, 9% Protestant (with 7.9% in Pentecostal denominations), 1.2% Jehovah's Witnesses, and 0.9% Mormons.

Although Jews account for less than 1% of Argentina's population, Buenos Aires has the second largest population of Jews in the Americas, second only to New York City. Argentina also has the largest Muslim minority in Latin America (see Islam in Argentina).

Emigration
According to official estimates there are 600,000 Argentines worldwide, and according to estimates by the International Organization for Migration there have been about 806,369 since 2001. It is estimated that their descendants would be around 1,900,000. The first wave of emigration occurred during the military dictatorship between 1976 and 1983, principally to Spain, the United States, Mexico and Venezuela. During the 1990s, due to the abolition of visas between Argentina and the United States, thousands of Argentines emigrated to North America. The last major wave of emigration occurred during the 2001 crisis, mainly to Europe, especially Spain, although there was also an increase in emigration to neighboring countries, particularly Brazil, Chile and Paraguay.

Europe

The rate of Argentine emigration to Europe (especially to Spain and Italy) peaked in the late 1970s and early 1980s and is noteworthy. Spain and Italy have the largest Argentine communities in Europe, however, there are also important communities in France, the United Kingdom and Germany.

Americas

The most popular immigration destinations in the Americas are: the United States and Brazil, and to a lesser degree, mostly to (Uruguay and Canada): Chile, Paraguay and Bolivia, while other communities settled in Venezuela, Peru, Colombia, Ecuador and Costa Rica.

Middle East

Israel is home to the largest Argentine diaspora in the Middle East.

Oceania

In Oceania, Australia has the largest Argentine community, followed by New Zealand.

See also

 List of Argentines
 Ethnography of Argentina
 Demographics of Argentina
 Immigration to Argentina
 History of Argentine nationality

 Indigenous peoples in Argentina
 Argentines in Uruguay
 Argentine Brazilians
 Argentina
 Argentine Americans
 Argentine Mexicans
 Argentines in Spain
 Hispanics

References

External links
 About Argentine population at www.Argentina.gov.ar 

Argentine people
+
South American people by nationality